Kelly Faszholz (born April 9, 1984) is an American female mixed martial artist who most notably competed in the Bantamweight division of the Ultimate Fighting Championship.

Mixed martial arts career

Early career
Kelly is a BJJ purple belt from Dallas, Texas, now training out of the Nor-Cal Fighting Alliance, former home of UFC vet David Mitchell and home to UFC vets Nate Loughran and Collin Hart and Strikeforce vet Alvin Cacdac under former UFC middleweight title contender David Terrell. She came to the UFC with a 3-0 record as a pro and at least two amateur fights. All her wins were via submission. Outside of MMA, she has a long history of competition as a grappler, both gi and no-gi.

Ultimate Fighting Championship

Faszholz made her UFC debut against Lauren Murphy on February 21, 2016 at UFC Fight Night: Cowboy vs. Cowboy.  She lost the fight via TKO due to punches and elbows in the final seconds of the third round.  The fight earned Kelly a Fight of the Night bonus award.

Kelly faced UFC newcomer Ketlen Vieira on October 1, 2016 at UFC Fight Night: Lineker vs. Dodson in Portland, Oregon, United States. She lost a close fight by split decision.

Invicta FC

After her last fight, she was released from the UFC and was signed to Invicta FC.

Kelly fought fellow UFC vet Elizabeth Phillips at Invicta FC 23: Porto vs. Niedźwiedź on May 20, 2017. Phillips missed weight by 5 pounds and the fight was held at 140 lbs, with 20% of Phillip's purse going to Kelly. She won the fight via unanimous decision.

Personal life
Kelly earned a BA Degree in Kinesiology after attending Texas Woman's University and University of North Texas.

Championships and accomplishments

Mixed martial arts
Ultimate Fighting Championship
Fight of the Night (One time) 
Prize FC
Prize FC Featherweight Championship (One time)
Sparta Combat League
SCL Bantamweight Championship (One time)

Mixed martial arts record

|-
| Win
| align=center| 4–2
| Elizabeth Phillips
| Decision (unanimous)
|Invicta FC 23: Porto vs. Niedźwiedź
|May 20, 2017
|align=center|3
|align=center|5:00
|Kansas City, Missouri, United States
|
|-
| Loss
| align=center| 3–2
| Ketlen Vieira
| Decision (split)
| UFC Fight Night: Lineker vs. Dodson
| 
| align=center| 3
| align=center| 5:00
| Portland, Oregon, United States
|
|-
| Loss
| align=center| 3–1
| Lauren Murphy
|TKO (elbows and punches)
|UFC Fight Night: Cowboy vs. Cowboy
|
|align=center|3
|align=center|4:55
|Pittsburgh, Pennsylvania, United States
|
|-
| Win
| align=center| 3–0
| Brittney Elkin
| Submission (rear-naked choke)
| Prize Fighting Championship 12
| 
| align=center| 2
| align=center| 3:48
| Denver, Colorado, United States
| 
|-
| Win
| align=center| 2–0
| Summer Bradshaw
| Submission (guillotine choke)
| SCL 42
| 
| align=center| 3
| align=center| 1:55
| Castle Rock, Colorado, United States
|
|-
| Win
| align=center| 1–0
| Kristen Gatz
| Submission (rear-naked choke)
| Nor-Cal Conflict
| 
| align=center| 1
| align=center| 2:11
| Santa Rosa, California, United States
|

See also 
 List of current UFC fighters
 List of female mixed martial artists

References

External links 
  
 

1984 births
Living people
American female mixed martial artists
Bantamweight mixed martial artists
Mixed martial artists utilizing Brazilian jiu-jitsu
Ultimate Fighting Championship female fighters
American practitioners of Brazilian jiu-jitsu
Female Brazilian jiu-jitsu practitioners
21st-century American women